Octave is a ghost town in Yavapai County, Arizona, United States.

History
Octave's population was 100 in 1920.

It does have a cemetery and scattered graves.

References

External links
 
 Octave – ghosttowns.com
 Octave – Ghost Town of the Month at azghosttowns.com

Unincorporated communities in Yavapai County, Arizona
Unincorporated communities in Arizona
Ghost towns in Arizona